Portability  may refer to:
Portability (social security), the portability of social security benefits
Porting, the ability of a computer program to be ported from one system to another in computer science
Software portability, the portability of a piece of software to multiple platforms
Telephone number portability (disambiguation) keeping one telephone number while switching one's account to another telephony provider
Portlet, user interface software components that are managed and displayed in a web portal
 Portability of the estate tax exclusion amount regarding Estate tax in the United States

See also 
 Portable (disambiguation)